Erika Sema was the defending champion, having won the event in 2012, but chose not to compete in 2013.

Han Na-lae won the tournament, defeating Kim Da-hye in the all-Korean final, 6–4, 6–4.

Seeds

Main draw

Finals

Top half

Bottom half

References 
 Main draw

Samsung Securities Cup - Women's Singles
2013 Women's Singles